Natalie Lynn Norris (born September 23, 1990) is an American former soccer player who played as a defender.

References

1990 births
Living people
People from Sandy, Utah
Soccer players from Utah
American women's soccer players
Women's association football defenders
Utah State Aggies women's soccer players
FC Kansas City players
National Women's Soccer League players